The 2015 season is Clube Atlético Mineiro's 107th in existence and ninth consecutive season in the top-flight of Brazilian football. Along with the Campeonato Brasileiro Série A and the Campeonato Mineiro, the club also competed in the Copa Libertadores and the Copa do Brasil.

On 3 May, Atlético Mineiro won its 43rd Campeonato Mineiro title, defeating Caldense in the finals. On 13 May, the team was eliminated from Copa Libertadores in the round of 16 by Internacional, the same stage it fell in Copa do Brasil to Figueirense on 26 August.

Season overview

Background and pre-season 
The previous season ended with two important events for the club. On 26 November 2014 Atlético won its first Copa do Brasil by beating rivals Cruzeiro in the finals and secured a spot in the 2015 edition of the Copa Libertadores, its third consecutive participation. A change in the club's board also occurred, with successful president Alexandre Kalil's term, which had started in 2008, coming to an end. Daniel Nepomuceno was elected for the office on 3 December 2014.

On 16 December 2014 Atlético announced the signing of Argentine striker Lucas Pratto from Vélez Sarsfield, elected Footballer of the Year of Argentina in the 2014 season. The pre-season, which started on 7 January, also saw the returns of Patric, Giovanni Augusto and Carlos César, previously out on loan. Danilo Pires, previously with Santa Cruz, joined the club on 12 January on loan from Corinthians Alagoano.

Former team captain Réver left the club on 14 January, after 4 and a half years of service, joining fellow Série A side Internacional. That day also saw Nikão, who was previously on loan at Ceará, leave the club and join Atlético Paranaense. Despite training with the squad in the start of the pre-season, Diego Tardelli departed the club, this time joining Chinese side Shandong Luneng on 17 January 2015, for a €5.5 million fee. A number of previously loaned players also returned to the club, only to be loaned again.

The pre-season included a friendly match against Shakhtar Donetsk, part of the Ukrainian club's tour in Brazil, that was played on 21 January and won by Atlético 4–2, with Pratto scoring its first goal for the club. A training match was also played against Minas Boca and ended 3–0.

February 
Campeonato Mineiro went underway on the first day of February and Atlético started the season with a 2–0 home win against Tupi, with goals by Dátolo and Pratto. On 6 February Sherman Cárdenas joined the club from Atlético Nacional, on a season-long loan deal with an option to purchase clause. The state league season seemed promising, with two more victories, 2–0 against Mamoré away and 2–1 over Democrata at home. The unbeaten run would end early, however, with three defeats happening in a single week.

Copa Libertadores didn't start well for Atlético, with the team failing to secure a good result against Colo-Colo in Santiago, with the match ending 2–0 to the Chilean side on 18 February. Things got worse after a 2–1 defeat to rivals América in the Campeonato Mineiro on 22 February, despite Galo scoring first and América having one man sent off. The bad run continued on 25 February, with the season's first home defeat: 0–1 against Mexican club Atlas, for the second round of the Copa Libertadores second stage.

March 
March saw some improvement in the team's form, with a 2–0 victory against Guarani in the state league coming on the first day of the month. On 8 March, Atlético played its first Clássico Mineiro of the season against Cruzeiro away at the Mineirão, which ended 1–1. Caldense managed to defeat Atlético 1–0 and continue their good run in the Campeonato Mineiro on 12 March. Things finally improved in the following game, a 4–0 home win against URT on 15 March, which started a streak of 4 consecutive victories. The second of them happened in the Copa Libertadores, in which the team defeated Santa Fe at El Campín 1–0, the match-winner being a header by Pratto who had returned to the squad after an injury. Two more 3–0 victories in the state league followed, on 22 March against Tombense away, and on 29 March against Villa Nova at home.

April 
The first stage of Campeonato Mineiro ended for Atlético with a 2–0 away defeat to Boa Esporte on 5 April, which meant the team finished on 3rd position and would face rivals Cruzeiro in the semi-finals. On 7 April a new signing was announced, and Thiago Ribeiro joined the club on loan from Santos. The team's comeback on Group 1 of Copa Libertadores seemed to continue with a 2–0 home win against Santa Fe on 9 April, but was interrupted by a 1–0 defeat to Atlas at the Jalisco on 15 April. This meant a 2–0 victory against Colo-Colo was needed in order for the club to qualify for the knockout stage. On 10 April, after falling out of favor with manager Levir Culpi, midfielder Pierre left the club after 4 years, joining Fluminense.

Meanwhile, the two-legged semi-finals against Cruzeiro started on home soil with a 1–1 at Independência on 12 April. The following week, on 19 April, the second leg was played at the Mineirão. Atlético trailed 1–0 in halftime, but two goals by Pratto, both of them assisted by Guilherme, were enough to secure a 2–1 victory and qualification to the finals to face Caldense. The decisive match against Colo-Colo was played on 22 April, and the needed 2–0 result came thanks to a sensational long strike by Rafael Carioca in the last minutes, which meant qualification to the round of 16. The first leg of the Mineiro finals against Caldense was Atlético's first home match of the season at the Mineirão, and ended 0–0 on 26 April.

May 
On 3 May, Campeonato Mineiro came to a conclusion, and Atlético were crowned champions of the competition for the 43rd time after a 2–1 win over Caldense in Varginha, with goals by newcomer Thiago Ribeiro and Jô. Cesinha's loan deal with the club ended and he returned to Bragantino on 5 May. The round of 16 of Copa Libertadores saw Atlético face fellow Brazilian side Internacional, with the first leg being played at the Independência on 6 May, and ending 2–2, with an injury time goal by Leonardo Silva. Centre-back Emerson was loaned to Avaí on 7 May until the end of the season. Atlético debuted in the 2015 Série A against Palmeiras at the Allianz Parque on 9 April, in a game which also ended 2–2, this time thanks to an injury time goal by the opposing team. Atlético's Libertadores campaign ended on 13 May, after a 3–1 defeat to Internacional at the Beira-Rio.

With Campeonato Mineiro finished and out of Copa Libertadores, the club now focused only in the Série A, and had to play its first league home game of the season away from Belo Horizonte, to comply with a ban imposed by the Superior Tribunal de Justiça Desportiva. The match happened on 17 May at the Mané Garrincha, in Brasília, and Atlético defeated Fluminense 4–1. On 24 May the team was defeated 1–0 by Atlético Paranaense in an away match played at the Arena da Baixada, which was followed by a 3–0 home victory over Vasco da Gama. Winger Neto Berola, who had returned in March from a loan spell to Al Wasl, left the club in a new loan deal, this time to Santos on 27 May.

June 
On 3 June Atlético defeated Avaí 4–1 at Florianópolis, the team's third consecutive victory by a 3-goal margin. The club's unbeaten run against rivals Cruzeiro, which had started in 2013 and lasted 11 games, however, came to an end on 6 June, in a 1–3 home defeat, even with Luan scoring the first goal of the game. The derby was followed by a 2–2 tie with Santos also at home on 10 June., the same day in which forward André left the club to join Sport on loan, and Marion, previously loaned to Al Sharjah, left to Joinville. Série A resumed on 20 June, with a 2–0 win over Flamengo at the Maracanã, followed by a 1–0 home victory over Joinville at the Mineirão.

July 
The team kept its good run in the Série A with a 2–0 win against Coritiba at the Independência on 1 July. Atlético returned to the Beira-Rio to face Internacional, this time achieving a 3–1 victory on 5 July, after which the team reached the top of the table. The winning streak went on with a 2–1 victory over then title contenders Sport at the Mineirão, on 8 July, the same day Jô left the club to join Al Shabab, and a 2–0 away win against Ponte Preta at the Moisés Lucarelli on 11 July. The unbeaten run ended on 18 July, when Atlético lost 1–0 to title contenders Corinthians at their Arena. A comeback followed on 25 July, in the form of a 1–0 victory over Figueirense at the Independência, and continued with a 3–1 win against São Paulo at the Mineirão, courtesy of a sensational first-half hat-trick by Pratto on 29 July. Midfielder Maicosuel, who had joined the club in 2014, was loaned out for a year to Al Sharjah on 27 July.

August 
The following month didn't start well for Galo, with a 0–0 away tie with Goiás on 9 July, and a 0–2 home defeat to Grêmio at the Mineirão on 14 July, which meant Corinthians surpassed the team in the league table. The bad run continued with a 2–1 away defeat against Chapecoense at Arena Condá, in a match with questionable refereeing decisions. Atlético debuted in the Copa do Brasil with a 1–1 home draw against Figueirense at the Independência, with a Leonardo Silva equaliser coming at injury time, again. On 20 August, left-back Mansur joined the club on loan from Vitória. The team seemed to get back on track with a 2–1 comeback against Palmeiras for the 19th round of the Série A, thanks to a brace by Pratto in what was the 100th match of the club at the "new" Independência. Guilherme was released by the club on 25 August, eventually joining Antalyaspor. A setback occurred in the second leg of the Copa do Brasil round of 16 against Figueirense, in which despite scoring first, the team allowed a comeback by the opposition in the last minutes and was eliminated from the competition. A 2–1 away Brasileirão victory over Fluminense at the Maracanã followed on 30 August.

September 
2 September saw yet another game with controversial refereeing, in which the team lost by Atlético Paranaense at home 0–1. Atlético then traveled to Rio de Janeiro again, this time to face Vasco da Gama, and won 2–1, which meant all three clubs from the state were defeated at the Maracanã. A home match against Avaí was the next, which the team won 2–0. The second Clássico Mineiro of the Série A season happened on 13 September at the Mineirão with the rivals as the home team, and ended 1–1, as Victor made a mistake in Cruzeiro's goal but ended up saving a penalty in injury time, right after Atlético's equaliser. On 16 September the team visited Santos and had its worst result of the season, being defeated 4–0 at Vila Belmiro. A comeback of sorts came in the following matchday, in which the team defeated interstate rivals Flamengo 4–1 at the Independência, with a fine display by Jesús Dátolo, completing six victories out of six possible against Rio's clubs in the season. One week later, Atlético failed to defeat last-placed Joinville at Arena Joinville, as the match finished 2–2 on 27 September.

October
October started with another away game, this one a 3–0 victory against Coritiba in Curitiba with a good performance by Pratto, on the third day of the month. After a ten-day break, the club defeated Internacional 2–1 at home on 14 October, with goals by Pratto and Marcos Rocha.

Kit
Supplier: Puma / Sponsors: MRV Engenharia, Vilma Alimentos, Cemil, TIM, Tenco, Supermercados BH

Players

Squad information
Players and squad numbers last updated on 19 September 2015.Note: Flags indicate national team as has been defined under FIFA eligibility rules. Players may hold more than one non-FIFA nationality.

Transfers

In

Loans in

Out

Loans out

Technical staff 

Last updated: 15 August 2015

Source: Clube Atlético Mineiro

Competitions

Overview

Pre-season friendly

Campeonato Mineiro

First stage

Knockout stage

Semi-finals

Finals

Copa Libertadores

Group stage

Knockout stage

Round of 16

Campeonato Brasileiro Série A

League table

Matches

Copa do Brasil

Round of 16

Squad statistics

Player appearances and goals 
Statistics correct as of 14 October 2015.

 denotes a player who has left the squad during the season.

|}

References

External links
 Official website

 

Clube Atlético Mineiro seasons
Atletico Mineiro